Matete is one of the 24 communes that are the administrative divisions of Kinshasa, the capital city of the Democratic Republic of the Congo.

Location 

Matete is located south of Boulevard Lumumba from the Matete River, just east of the Limete Tower interchange, to the Ndjili River further east.  The two rivers are the western and eastern boundaries of the commune.  In the west the commune extends south to the level of Rue Frontière and in the east down to the level of Mbamba Kilenda street.

Matete's neighboring communes going clockwise from the south are: Kisenso, Lemba, Limete, and Ndjili.

Government 

The administration of Matete is led by an unelected government appointed burgomaster.  As of 2023 the burgomaster is Jules Mukumbi.  The reform of having burgomasters elected by communal councils awaits the inaugural election of these councils.

Electoral district  
With 134,452 on its voter rolls Matete is an electoral district for both the election of a nine-member communal council and that of a deputy of the Provincial Assembly of Kinshasa.  The council election is by open list.  For the National Assembly Matete is part of the Kinshasa III district (Mont Amba).

Nationwide communal council elections were scheduled for 22 September 2019 but did not take place.  In December of that year President Tshisekedi declared that these elections would be held sometime in 2020.

The Provincial Assembly election was held as part of the general elections on 30 December 2018.  Joseph Malungeni Makengo (MLC) is the deputy representing Matete in the new legislature.

Administrative divisions 
In 2014 the numerous neighborhoods of Matete were divided among the following 13 quarters:

Each of these is managed by a quarter chief.

Notes

References

Communes of Kinshasa
Mont Amba District